Cibyra rileyi is a species of moth of the family Hepialidae. It is native to Brazil.

References

External links
Hepialidae genera

Moths described in 1951
Hepialidae